Kunratice is a municipality and village in Děčín District in the Ústí nad Labem Region of the Czech Republic. It has about 200 inhabitants.

Administrative parts
The villages of Lipnice and Studený are administrative parts of Kunratice.

References

External links

Villages in Děčín District